tRNA pseudouridine38/39 synthase (Deg1, Pus3p, pseudouridine synthase 3) is an enzyme with systematic name tRNA-uridine38/39 uracil mutase. This enzyme catalyses the following chemical reaction

 tRNA uridine38/39  tRNA pseudouridine38/39

The enzyme from Saccharomyces cerevisiae is active only towards uridine38 and uridine39.

See also
PUS1
Mitochondrial_tRNA_pseudouridine27/28_synthase

References

External links 
 

EC 5.4.99